Waldemar Skrzypczak (born 19 January 1956, in Szczecin) is a Polish general. From 2006 to 2009 he was the commander of Polish Land Forces. From 8 September 2011 he is an adviser at the Polish Ministry of National Defence. At 25 June 2012 he became deputy minister of defense, responsible for armament and modernization.

He was the 4th commander of the Multinational Division Central-South (in 2005).

External links
				Polish army chief quits amid row, BBC News, 20 August 2009

1956 births
Polish generals
Living people
Military personnel from Szczecin
Recipients of the Order of Polonia Restituta